Monte Mucrone (or simply Mucrone) is an Alpine mountain of Piedmont (NW Italy).

Geography 

The mountain belongs to the Biellese Alps, a sub-range of Pennine Alps; the Bocchetta del Lago, a pass at 2,026  m, divides it from the rest of the chain. The Mucrone is located between Elvo and Cervo valleys, and belongs to the Province of Biella. Administratively its main summit is the tripoint at which the borders of the municipalities of Biella, Sordevolo and Pollone meet. It visually dominates the Sanctuary of Oropa. On a subsummit at 2,302  m stands a huge metal cross. On a second subsummit, NW of the main elevation, stands the upper station of an old branch of the Oropa cableway, dismantled in 1982.

SOIUSA classification 
According to the SOIUSA (International Standardized Mountain Subdivision of the Alps) the mountain can be classified in the following way:
 main part = Western Alps
 major sector = North Western Alps
 section = Pennine Alps
 subsection = Southern  Valsesia Alps
 supergroup = Alpi Biellesi
 group = Catena Tre Vescovi - Mars
 subgroup =
 code = I/B-9.IV-A.1

Access to the summit

The easiest route for the Mucrone summit is a waymarked footpath which starts from Oropa Sport (the Oropa cableway upper station); the hike flanks at first a small lake, then reaches the Bocchetta del Lago and from there the summit, climbing the NW ridge of the mountain.

Mountain huts 
Nearby Oropa Sport, at 1,850  m, is located Rifugio Rosazza, a permanent mountain hut.

Maps
 Italian official cartography (Istituto Geografico Militare - IGM); on-line version: www.pcn.minambiente.it
 Provincia di Biella cartography: Carta dei sentieri della Provincia di Biella, 1:25.00 scale, 2004; on line version:  webgis.provincia.biella.it
 Carta dei sentieri e dei rifugi, 1:50.000 scale, nr. 9 Ivrea, Biella e Bassa Valle d'Aosta, Istituto Geografico Centrale - Torino

References
 

Mucrone
Mucrone
Mucrone